The Farrington Twinstar is an American two-seat autogyro that was designed and produced by Farrington Aircraft of Paducah, Kentucky, a company owned by Don Farrington. Now out of production, when it was available the aircraft was supplied as a kit for amateur construction.  It first flew in 1993.

Design and development
The aircraft was designed to comply with the US Experimental - Amateur-built aircraft rules. It features a single main rotor, a two-seats-in tandem open cockpit with a windshield, tricycle landing gear without wheel pants, plus a tail caster. The tail consists of two vertical stabilizers and rudders.

The aircraft fuselage is made from a combination of welded steel and bolted-together aluminum tubing, with a fiberglass cockpit fairing.

The manufacturer estimated the construction time from the supplied kit as 200 hours.

Operational history
By 1998 the company reported that 25 kits had been sold and five aircraft were completed and flying.

In March 2015 six examples were registered in the United States with the Federal Aviation Administration, although a total of 12 had been registered at one time.

Specifications (Twinstar)

See also
List of rotorcraft

References

Twinstar
1990s United States sport aircraft
1990s United States civil utility aircraft
Homebuilt aircraft
Single-engined pusher autogyros
Aircraft first flown in 1993